The 2008 MSBL season was the 20th season of the Men's State Basketball League (SBL). The regular season began on Friday 28 March and ended on Saturday 2 August. The finals began on Friday 8 August and ended on Saturday 6 September, when the Goldfields Giants defeated the Willetton Tigers in the MSBL Grand Final.

Regular season
The regular season began on Friday 28 March and ended on Saturday 2 August after 19 rounds of competition.

Standings

Finals
The finals began on Friday 8 August and ended on Saturday 6 September with the MSBL Grand Final.

Bracket

Awards

Statistics leaders

Regular season
 Most Valuable Player: Curtis Marshall (Geraldton Buccaneers)
 Coach of the Year: John Gardiner (Perry Lakes Hawks)
 Most Improved Player: Chris Dodd (Stirling Senators)
 All Star First Team:
 Curtis Marshall (Geraldton Buccaneers)
 Michael Lay (Geraldton Buccaneers)
 Peter Crawford (Perry Lakes Hawks)
 Jeff Dowdell (Wanneroo Wolves)
 Sean Sonderleiter (Perry Lakes Hawks)
 All Star Second Team:
 Adam Caporn (Rockingham Flames)
 Joseph Nixon (Kalamunda Eastern Suns)
 Carmichael Olowoyo (Stirling Senators)
 Tom Garlepp (Perry Lakes Hawks)
 Damian Matacz (Wanneroo Wolves)
 All Star Third Team:
 Joe-Alan Tupaea (Perry Lakes Hawks)
 Ben Hunt (Willetton Tigers)
 Chris Dodd (Stirling Senators)
 Christian Moody (Lakeside Lightning)
 Michael Haney (Goldfields Giants)

Finals
 Grand Final MVP: Darnell Dialls (Goldfields Giants)

References

External links
 2008 SBL season at sbl.asn.au
 2008 fixtures
 July 2008 review
 2008 grand final preview

2008
2007–08 in Australian basketball
2008–09 in Australian basketball